Disney Star Network is an Indian media conglomerate owned by The Walt Disney Company India  wholly owned by The Walt Disney Company. It is headquartered in Mumbai, Maharashtra. Disney Star network runs more than 70 TV channels in eight languages, reaching out to 9 out of 10 cable and satellite TV homes in India. The network reaches approximately 790 million viewers a month across India and more than 100 countries. Disney Star generates more than 30,000 hours of content every year. Disney Star is the largest television and entertainment network in India.

History

Founding 
Star TV (Satellite Television Asian Region) was founded in 1990 as a joint venture between Hutchison Whampoa and Li Ka-Shing. It launched Hollywood English-language entertainment channels for Asian audiences.

1990–2000 
In 1990, Star TV started with the first 5 channels included Star Plus (then an English-language entertainment channel), Star Chinese Channel, Fox Sports (Asian TV Network), Channel V and BBC World Service Television.

In 1992, Rupert Murdoch’s News Corporation purchased 63.6% of Star India for $525 million, followed by the purchase of the remaining 36.4% on 1 January 1993. Star broadcasting operations were run from Rupert Murdoch's Fox Broadcasting premises. Murdoch declared that: 
Between 1994 and 1998, Star India was launched, later launched Star Movies, Channel V, and Star News with a limited Hindi offering, and then Star Plus for Indian viewers.

In 1998, Star News was launched as a dedicated news channel with content from NDTV.

2001–2010 
In 2001, Star India acquired South India based Vijay TV. In 2003, Star India's deal with NDTV ended and Star News was made into a 24-hour news channel. Disney bought it in 2009 for $2 Million or 2 Cnt venture (JV) with Anand Bazar Patrika Group to comply with the regulations set for uplinking of news and current affairs channels by the Government of India. It subsequently exited from this joint venture in 2012. After the split the channel was renamed ABP News and operated by Anandabazar Patrika Group.

In 2004, Star One Indian TV channel was launched as a Hindi content channel. In 2008, Star Jalsha, a Bengali language entertainment channel and Star Pravah, a Marathi language entertainment channel were launched.

In 2009, Star India acquired Thiruvananthapuram,  Kerala based media conglomerate Asianet Communications which served Malayalam language content. In August 2009, the Star Group restructured its Asian broadcast businesses into three units – Star India, Star China Media, and Fox International Channels Asia.

In the same year, Star Affiliate and CJ Group of South Korea launched CJ Alive (later known as Shop CJ), a 24-hour Indian television shopping channel which used Star Utsav for hosting the television marketing programs in six-hour slots in its initial stage of launch. Star Affiliate exited the joint venture in May 2014. This venture was called Star CJ.

News Corporation launched a film production and distribution business in India through Fox Star Studios India, an affiliate of Star India in the same year.

2011–2017 
In April 2012, Star won the rights to Board of Control for Cricket in India (BCCI) through 2018, replacing Nimbus Communications.

On 6 November 2013, Star India rebranded its Star Sports channels, renaming the main Star Sports channel to Star Sports 1, Star Cricket to Hindi-language Star Sports 3, ESPN  to Tamil-language Star Sports 4, and Star Cricket HD and ESPN HD to Star Sports HD1 and HD2.

In February 2015, Star India launched its streaming service, Hotstar, a mobile and online entertainment OTT platform that features content in 9 Indian languages and broadcasts sporting events. Star also acquired the broadcast businesses of Maa Television Pvt. Ltd to boost its presence in Telugu-speaking markets.

In February 2017, Star India and global media conglomerate, TED, announced a new TV series, TED Talks India – Nayi Soch. Its programmes starred Bollywood actor Shahrukh Khan and featured newer TED talks made in Hindi language. The programme followed the signature TED format of prominent speakers voicing their opinions in an 18-minute or less monologue in front of a live audience.

On 28 August 2017, Star India replaced its Hindi Entertainment channel Life OK with a free-to-air channel Star Bharat.

On 5 September 2017, Star India won the global media rights to broadcast the Indian Premier League (IPL) under a five-year deal beginning in the 2018 tournament, and valued at 163.475 billion. Beating previous rightsholder Sony, the contract included domestic rights for Star Sports, and digital rights for Hotstar.

In 2018, Star India renewed its BCCI rights through March 2023, in a contract valued at 

On 14 December 2017, The Walt Disney Company announced the acquisition of 21st Century Fox, which included Star India.

2018–2022 
On 13 December 2018, Disney announced Uday Shankar who serves as chairman of Star India would lead Disney's Asian operations and would become the new chairman of The Walt Disney Company India, which became a wholly owned subsidiary of The Walt Disney Company, being re-organized under The Walt Disney Company (India). On 27 August 2018, the channel Star Life was launched in Africa in English language offering the English dubbed Indian Hindi series from the Indian star channels.

On 4 January 2019, Star TV shut down its television operations in USA for the promotion of its digital counterpart, Hotstar.

On 20 March 2019, Star India became a subsidiary of The Walt Disney Company India as the deal was closed. Now, Disney India owns UTV Software Communications and Star India TV channels.

In April 2020, Disney merged Hotstar with Disney+ in India forming Disney+ Hotstar with Hotstar operating independently and coexisting with Disney+ in Canada and US,  since it's launched on 4 September 2017; the United Kingdom on 13 September 2018; and Singapore on 4 November 2020, prior to Disney+ in the country.

On 30 December 2020, Disney announced that the Star branding would be replaced with Utsav from 1 February in the Netherlands, with the Utsav Gold, Utsav Plus and Utsav Bharat branding launching in the UK on 22 January 2021, Star Vijay's international feed also changed a new logo based with Utsav Network in yellow colour and rebranded as Vijay TV around the world on that same day, Utsav Network would separated to Star Gold, Plus and Bharat, the Asian feed would launch in South Korea.

On 31 August 2021, Disney announced that it would phase out Hotstar in the US and move all contents into Hulu and ESPN+. Initially, it was announced that the service would shut down in the US by late 2022, until it got moved to an earlier date on 30 November 2021.

On 18 October 2021, Disney and Star announced that they would exit from the English general entertainment industry and that they would close down Star World Indian TV Channel and Star World Premiere Indian TV Channel originally planned by 30 November 2021 (although the Star Movies channels, alongside Disney International HD will not be affected). The Bangla and Marathi feeds of Star Sports 1 will also close on the same day. Meanwhile, the Star Gold brand would expand with the launch of an HD simulcast of Star Gold 2 that would replace UTV HD, alongside the rebranding of UTV Movies and UTV Action as Star Gold Romance and Star Gold Thrills. Star Movies Select HD, Star Movies Hindi, Star Movies Tamil will also launch an SD simulcast, becoming the first niche premium English movie channel in India to do so. However, a delay in TRAI's new tariff order, followed by protests from digital cable operators and multi-system operators, caused the plans to be postponed till mid-March 2023.

2022 to present 
On 14 April 2022, The Walt Disney Company India rebranded Star India to Disney Star. On 27 May 2022, Fox Star Studios was renamed Star Studios, as part of the removal of the "Fox" name from the studios that had been acquired from 21st Century Fox by Disney. Disney Star launched Odia GEC Star Kiran on 6th June 2022.

Business results 
In August 2012, Business Line of The Hindu group reported that STAR CJ Alive is claiming average sale of products worth Rs. 9.5 million on week days and Rs. 12 million on weekends. Approximately 65% of the sales come from electronics segment while household segment stands second in the race. In December 2012, some sections of the media reported that Rupert Murdoch run News Corp may exit Star CJ by selling its entire stake to Providence Equity Partners. This share transfer reportedly ran into trouble when the Department of Revenue discovered that funds from other jurisdictions were being channelised to exploit Indo Mauritius double taxation avoidance agreement.

STAR India Entertainment provides 60 channels while STAR India Sports provides 17 channels.

Divisions 
 Disney Star Asianet
 Star Gold
 Star Jalsha
 Star Kiran
 Star Maa
 Star Pravah
 Star Sports
 Star Studios
 Star Suvarna
 Star Vijay
 Utsav TV
 Novi Digital Entertainment
 Disney+ Hotstar
 Mashal Sports (74%)
 Pro Kabaddi league
 Football Sports Development (35%)
 Indian Super League

Owned channels

On air channels

India

International

Upcoming channels

Dissolved channels

See also 
 Disney Channel (India)
 Star Studios
 The Walt Disney Company India

Notes

References

Further reading

External links 

 

 
Mass media companies established in 1990
Disney India
Former News Corporation subsidiaries
Indian subsidiaries of foreign companies
Mass media companies of India
Television broadcasting companies of India
Television companies of India
Television networks in India
Television production companies of India
The Walt Disney Company subsidiaries
Indian companies established in 1990